The Federation of Indian Rationalist Associations (FIRA) is an umbrella body of 83 (as of 2012) rationalist, atheist, skeptic, secularist and scientist organisations in India.

As an apex body of rationalist organisations, it is committed to the development of scientific temper and humanism in India, involved in promoting tolerance, critical thinking, women's rights, secularization, and freedom of expression, and fighting against the caste system and violence (especially towards Dalit population), superstition, pseudoscience, and child marriage.

History

The Federation of Indian Rationalist Associations was launched on 7 February 1997 following the 10th Kerala State Conference of Kerala Yukthivadi Sangham. The stated purpose of the organization is to coordinate the activities of the member organizations at the national level.

Basava Premanand is the founder of the FIRA who died on 4 October 2009. Shortly before his death, Premanand put out a statement declaring his commitment to rationalism to prevent false rumors that he had turned to god on his deathbed.

In 2004, Premanand put forth a proposal for Narendra Nayak to become president of FIRA at a general body meeting held at Bhatinda, Punjab. It was unanimously accepted. Premanand and Nayak met in 1980 or 1981 when Nayak was the secretary of Dakshina Kannada Rationalist Association.
U. Kalanathan of Kerala Yukthivadi Sangham is the current General Secretary of the organization. FIRA has grown from about 50 organizations in 2005 to 83 organizations in 2012.

Affiliation to IHEU 

FIRA is affiliated to International Humanist and Ethical Union and supports minimum statement on Humanism (as required by IHEU bylaw 5.1) and the Amsterdam Declaration 2002.

Minimum statement 
"Humanism is a democratic and ethical life stance, which affirms that human beings have the right and responsibility to give meaning and shape to their own lives. It stands for the building of a more humane society through an ethic based on human and other natural values in the spirit of reason and free inquiry through human capabilities. It is not theistic, and it does not accept supernatural views of reality."

FIRA member organisations

National conferences 
FIRA has so far convened twelve national conferences:
 Palakkad, Kerala: 7 February 1997
 Hyderabad, Andhra Pradesh: 21 & 22 March 1998
 Coimbatore, Tamil Nadu: 7, 8 & 9 December 2001
 Mangalore, Karnataka: 10 & 11 May 2003
 Bhatinda, Punjab: 2, 3 & 4 April 2004
 Pune, Maharashtra: 28 & 29 April 2007
 Chennai, Tamil Nadu: 26 & 27 December 2009
 Nagpur, Maharashtra: 11 & 12 February 2012
 Brahmapur, Odisha: 24 & 25 December 2014
 Trivandrum, Kerala: 24 & 25 February 2017
 Visakhapatnam, Andhra Pradesh: 5 & 6 January 2019
 Barnala, Punjab: 29 & 30 October 2022

Targeted attacks on rationalists 

Although India is a secular democracy, blasphemy laws are still enforced under the Indian penal code and threats of violence are common for members of the Federation of Indian Rationalist Associations. Secular organizations such as FIRA have received pushback and protest from far-right groups.

In 2017, Gauri Lankesh was assassinated by an unknown terrorist in her home. She was a journalist and rationalist. She was outspoken against Hindutva, a right-wing Indian nationalist movement. The Columbia Journalism Review states that the Hindutva is "associated with activities ranging from lynchings, riots, and bomb blasts to threats of rape, dismemberment, incarceration, and hanging of people critical of them and their sectarian idea of India." Narendra Nayak of FIRA, along with many other international skeptical organizations, condemned the assassination of Gauri Lankesh in a CFI press release stating, "as a fellow member on the hit list of these organizations, I feel sad that I have lost a good friend and a supporter. She was one of those who was not afraid to speak her mind on any issue which she felt was important."

Narendra Dabholkar of the Maharashtra Andhashraddha Nirmoolan Samiti (MANS) was assassinated by gun shot on 20 August 2013 in Pune, Maharashtra. The assassination followed the introduction of the Anti-Superstition and Black Magic Bill which was deemed "anti-Hindu" by far-right groups. In 2018, Dr. Shantanu Abhyankar, President, Maharashtra Andhashraddha Nirmoolan Samiti, presented at CSICon discussing the Anti-Superstition and Black Magic Bill.

See also 
Prabir Ghosh
Basava Premanand
List of prizes for evidence of the paranormal
Narendra Nayak
Narendra Dabholkar

Similar organisations 
Indian Humanist Association
Indian Rationalist Association
Indian Secular Society
Radical Humanist Association of India
Maharashtra Rationalist Association
Science and Rationalists Association of India
Manavatavadi Vishwa Sansthan (The International School of Humanitarian Thoughts and Practice), Rajghat, Kurukshetra, Haryana

Manavavedhy Kerala

Rationalism and science in ancient India 
Ajita Kesakambali
Atheism in Hinduism
Cārvāka
History of science and technology in India
Bārhaspatya Sūtras
Lokayata: A Study in Ancient Indian Materialism

References

External links 
 Report on 8th National Conference of FIRA held in Nagpur in February 2012
 Report on 7th National Conference of FIRA in The Modern Rationalist
 Report on Fourth National Conference of FIRA in The Hindu
 Fighting for Separation of Religion and State in India : IHEU report on the demonstration organized by FIRA in support of Secularism on Parliament Street in New Delhi.
 Humanism in India today IHEU report
 FIRA's Proposal : A brief report in The Tribune, Chandigarh, on the demonstration organized by FIRA in support of Secularism on Parliament Street in New Delhi
 Rationalists target yoga, spirituality, Art of Living : Report in Indian Express on the 6th National Conference of FIRA (Accessed on 2 May 2007)
 Carvaka4India.com
 RationalThoughts.org

Rationalist groups based in India
Organizations established in 1997
Secularism in India